Paolo Orano (15 June 1875 – 7 April 1945) was an Italian psychologist, politician and writer. Orano began his political career as a revolutionary syndicalist in Italian Socialist Party. He later became a leading figure within the National Fascist Party, in part through his legitimization of anti-Semitism.

Early life
Orano was born in 1875 in Rome to a local father and a Sardinian mother. He learned literature and philosophy at University of Rome and graduated in 1898. In the next year he began teaching philosophy high schools, including in Siena, Senigallia and Tivoli. He also worked with various publishers.

Syndicalism
Orano began his political career as one of a number of leading syndicalist thinkers associated with the Italian Socialist Party at the turn of the century. His estrangement from the Socialists began in 1905 when he resigned his position at the newspaper Avanti! following the dismissal of syndicalist Enrico Leone.

Along with fellow syndicalists Arturo Labriola and Robert Michels, as well as nationalist Enrico Corradini, Orano became part of a group of intellectuals who followed the ideals of Georges Sorel. To this end he founded his own weekly journal, La Lupa, in October 1910. It came to represent the first collaboration between syndicalists like Orano and nationalists like Enrico Corradini. Benito Mussolini would later claim that this paper was an influence on his political ideas.
Orano became a strong critic of democracy, seeing it as the cause of Italy's ills and his rhetoric, along with that of fellow syndicalists such as Filippo Corridoni and Angelo Olivetti, was by 1914 very similar to that coming from the Italian Nationalist Association. Orano supported the First World War, ostensibly because he hoped that it would strengthen both the bourgeoisie and proletariat and thus hasten the process of class conflict and revolution. However his views caused considerable controversy within the syndicalist movement and helped to bring about its fragmentation as many of those associated with the movement, in particular Leone, were anti-war. By the end of the war his positions were largely indistinguishable from those of the nationalists.

Fascism
Orano soon moved over to the Fascists and during the March on Rome he served as Mussolini's chief of staff, whilst also occupying a seat on the Grand Council of the party. He enjoyed a high-profile under the fascist government, serving in the parliament and holding the post of rector of the University of Perugia.

His most notable contribution to fascism was his anti-semitism and he was the author in 1937 of the book The Jews in Italy. The book was influenced by Bernard Lazare in so much as it accepted his thesis that the activities of the Jews themselves helped to cause anti-semitism, although it made no reference to Lazare's refutations of the prejudice. In the book Orano expressed affection for some individual Jews, notably Ettore Ovazza, but nonetheless the book helped to legitimise anti-Semitism as a part of Italian fascism and laid the groundwork for later persecutions. Despite this the non-biological nature of his anti-semitism meant that he did not go far enough for Giovanni Preziosi, who attacked Orano's work in his journal La Vita Italiana.

Captured in 1944 he was held along with many fellow fascist officials at a prison camp at Padula where he died the following year following complications with a peptic ulcer haemorrhage.

Other writing
As well as his political writing Orano was also noted for his psychological and philosophical work. His 1897 book Cristo e Quirino criticised Christianity from a Nietzschean perspective, suggesting that it told people to accept their lot in life and thus solidified hierarchy in society. Mussolini would later use these arguments about the parallels between the Roman Catholic Church and the Roman Empire, and thus common ground between fascism and Catholicism, during his negotiations with Pius XI, much to horror of the pontiff who considered the very notion heretical.

His 1902 book Psicologia Sociale sought to attack transpersonal psychology and instead argued in favour of materialism and inductive reasoning that took into account the works of Karl Marx and Charles Darwin.

References

1875 births
1945 deaths
Italian fascists
Italian syndicalists
Italian psychologists
Italian male writers
Italian Socialist Party politicians
Writers from Rome
National syndicalists
Antisemitism in Italy
Academic staff of the University of Perugia
Deaths from ulcers
Deaths from gastrointestinal hemorrhage
Italian magazine founders